Acacia acradenia, commonly known as Velvet Hill wattle and silky wattle, is a shrub or tree belonging to the genus Acacia and the subgenus Juliflorae. It is native to northern and central Australia. The Indigenous Australian group the Nyangumarta peoples know it as walypuna the Alyawarr call it ampwey, the Jaminjung and Ngaliwurru know it as Mindiwirri, the Jaru as binbali or gundalyji, the Kaytetye as ampweye or arwele and the Warlpiri as ngardurrkura.

Description
It is generally V-shaped with an open and usually spindly form. It usually divides above ground level to form some main stems that are straight, diagonally spreading to erect and covered in smooth light grey bark except toward the base where it can become longitudinally fissured. The phyllodes are usually obliquely elliptic to narrowly elliptic in shape that becomes narrowed at both ends. It can bloom at any time of year but mostly between March and July and October and November producing yellow flowers. Each simple inflorescences occurs in pairs at the axil of the phyllodes. Following flowering many seed pods form that are crowded on the receptacles.

The species is relatively short lived, is easily killed by fire but sprouts readily from seeds.

Taxonomy
The species was first formally described by the botanist Ferdinand von Mueller in 1888 as part of the work Iconography of Australian Species of Acacia and Cognate Genera Decas. It was reclassified as Racosperma acradenium in 1987 by Leslie Pedley then transferred back to the genus Acacia in 2006. The only other synonyms are Acacia curvicarpa and Acacia acradena.

The specific epithet is taken from the Greek words acron meaning tip and adenos meaning (gland which is thought to be referring to  gland-like apical point at the tip of the phyllodes.

In tropical parts of the Northern Territory and Queensland A. acradenia is often mistaken for Acacia umbellata.

The type specimen was collected by von Mueller near Depot Creek in the Northern Territory.

Distribution
The species is found throughout the Northern Territory extending east into Queensland as far as Prairie and Western Australia. In Western Australia it has a scattered distribution through the Kimberley, Pilbara and northern Goldfields regions. It is found on rocky plains or rocky hills, and along watercourses or damp areas. It grows well in stony soils, skeletal loams or clay pans as part of spinifex and Eucalypt communities. Localized colonies form in areas following disturbance such as fire.

Uses
Indigenous Australians use the species as a food source, water source, shade or shelter and to make weapons and implements.

See also
 List of Acacia species

References

External links 
 The Australasian Virtual Herbarium – Distribution of Acacia acradenia

acradenia
Acacias of Western Australia
Taxa named by Ferdinand von Mueller
Plants described in 1888
Flora of Queensland
Flora of the Northern Territory